Sir Ralph Winwood (c. 1563 – 27 October 1617) was an English diplomat and statesman to the Jacobean court.

Early life
Ralph Winwood was born the son of Richard Winwood at Aynhoe in Northamptonshire, and was educated at St John's College, Oxford (1577), Magdalen College, Oxford (1582), and Padua (1594), studying law at Gray's Inn from 1617.

In 1599, he became secretary to Sir Henry Neville (c. 1562-1615), the English ambassador in France, and he succeeded Neville in this position two years later, retaining it until 1603.  He was Clerk of Privy Council (extraordinary) from 1603 to 1608, and (ordinary) from 1608 to 1609.  In 1603 Winwood was sent to The Hague as agent to the States-General of the United Provinces, and was appointed a member of the Dutch council of state on the basis of the Treaty of Nonsuch.  Winwood's hearty dislike of Spain coloured all his actions in Holland; he was anxious to see a continuance of the war between Spain and the United Netherlands, and expressed both his own views and those of the English government at the time when he wrote, "how convenient this war would be for the good of His Majesty's realms, if it might be maintained without his charge." He was knighted on 28 June 1607.

In June 1608, Winwood signed the league between England and the United Provinces, and he was in Holland when the trouble over the succession to the duchies of Jülich and Cleves threatened to cause a European war. In this matter, he negotiated with the Protestant Princes of Germany on behalf of King James I of England. While in Holland he obtained greyhounds for Anne of Denmark from Jacob van den Eynde, Governor of Woerden. He was appointed Master of Requests from 1609 to 1614.

Having returned to England Sir Ralph became secretary of state and Privy Councillor from 1614 until his death and a Member of Parliament (MP) for Buckingham. 

In the House of Commons he defended the king's right to levy impositions.  Created principal Secretary of state on Somerset's demise, Winwood held the office from March 1614 to his death during the Addled Parliament. Winwood was responsible for the inquiry into the murder of Sir Thomas Overbury and the release of Raleigh from the Tower in 1616. Raleigh was urged by Winwood to attack the Spanish fleet and the Spanish settlements in South America.  

Spanish envoys at Court of St James's made several written complaints about the secretary's share in this undertaking to the king at Whitehall Palace. In the midst of this latest foreign policy crisis, Sir Ralph Winwood died in London on 28 October 1617.  It can hardly be doubted, wrote Gardiner, that, if he had lived till the following summer, he would have shared in Raleigh's ruin.

Marriage
Ralph Winwood married Elizabeth Ball, daughter of Nicholas Ball of Totnes, Devon, by whom he had five sons (2 of whom predeceased him) and four daughters. One of Winwood's daughters, Anne Winwood (d. 1643), married Edward Montagu, 2nd Baron Montagu of Boughton, and their son was Ralph Montagu, 1st Duke of Montagu.

References

Bibliography
 Winwood's official correspondence and other papers passed to the Duke of Montagu. From 1899, they were in the possession of the Duke of Buccleuch.  They are calendared in the Report of the Historical Manuscripts Commission on the manuscripts of the Duke of Buccleuch.  See the Introduction to this Report (1899).

Sources
 
 
 
 

1560s births
1617 deaths
People from Aynho
Alumni of St John's College, Cambridge
Alumni of Magdalen College, Oxford
Members of Gray's Inn
Secretaries of State of the Kingdom of England
English MPs 1614
Clerks of the Privy Council
16th-century English diplomats
Ambassadors of England to the Netherlands
17th-century English diplomats